Cerisy Abbey, otherwise the Abbey of Saint Vigor, located in Cerisy-la-Forêt (near Saint-Lô), Manche, France, was an important Benedictine monastery of Normandy.

History
The abbey was founded in 1032 by the Duke of Normandy Robert the Magnificent on the site of an older monastery destroyed by the Normans during their invasion. It was dedicated to Saint Vigor. It benefited from considerable donations and favors. The abbey became an important economic and intellectual center, welcoming several kings of France several times and counting several intellectuals among its members. It also had a large number of outbuildings in the form of monastic granges which contributed to ensure a colossal income. It bore the title of "royal abbey" (under the protection of the King of France).

In the 12th century, Cerisy extended its powers over the former Merovingian abbeys of Deux-Jumeaux and Saint-Fromond and founded priories at Saint-Marcouf, Barnavast and Vauville. At that time, a common devotion to the cause of the Roman Church united the Normans of England, France, Southern Italy, and Greece. Everywhere, their military effectiveness was asserted, as well as their talent for construction. In 1178, Pope Alexander III confirmed with a special bull the privileges of the abbey of Cerisy, which reached the height of its glory during the end of the 12th century.

Cerisy became an important market town at this time. The abbey eventually consisted of forty-eight parishes and eight priories, including two in England (at Monk Sherborne and Peterborough). Depending on the Holy See, Cerisy maintained close relations with the monasteries of Mont-Saint-Michel, Saint-Ouen, Jumièges, Bec-Hellouin, Fécamp and of course Caen.

In 1337, the dynastic rivalries between the Valois and the kings of England precipitated the country into the Hundred Years War, which plunged the country into misery, aggravated by epidemics of plague. The abbey was fortified and a garrison settled there. In 1418, Richard de Silly, knight and captain of the abbey, was obliged to cede the abbey to the King of England. However, after the victory of the constable de Richemont over the English at Formigny in 1450, Normandy returned definitively to the kingdom of France.

Following the Concordat of Bologna in 1516, the abbey was placed in commendam, lall the abbeys in the kingdom; this meant that the abbot was no longer named by the community of monks, that he might be a layman, and obtained the profits of the abbey's income, while the spiritual power was entrusted to a prior. Its administration was sometimes entrusted to a person appointed outside the community. This is the end of his independence. The abbey declined until the death of the last commendatory abbot, Paul d'Albert de Luynes, archbishop of Sens, in 1788.

After a period of decline at the end of the Middle Ages, the abbey underwent a period of artistic renaissance with the Congregation of Saint-Maur in 1716. In the 18th century, new agricultural buildings were built. The monks left it in the French Revolution, and the abbey became the unique parish church of the village of Cerisy-la-Forêt in 1790. Following its sale as national property during the Revolution most monastic buildings were sold to a contractor who demolished them and then sold the stones for the construction of roads and houses. The land was also sold at this time. Thereafter, what remained of the conventual buildings (including the chapel of St. Gerbold) was sold to the abbey's farm, which enabled them to be saved.

Heritage Listing
The abbey church is classified as historic monuments by the list of 1840 while the rest of the abbey is classified in 1938.

Abbots
 Durand 1030–1032, monk of Saint-Ouen
 Almodus 1032–1033
 Garin 1033–1066
 Hugues I 1066–1117
 Hugues II 1117–1167
 Martin 1167–1190
 Robert 1190–1198
 Bertrand 1198–1210
 Jean I 1210–1220
 Thomas I 1220–1223
 Robert I 1223–1232
 Nicolas I 1233–1234
 Radulphe ~1239
 Pierre I ~1239
 Hugues III ~1240
 Nicolas II ~1243
 Osmond 1249–1251
 Laurent I 1252–1276
 Guillaume de Saint-Gabriel 1276–1284
 Thomas de Saonnet 1284–1286
 Benoist 1290–1292
 Thomas III 1292–1297
 Robert II 1297–1307
 Noël I 1339
 Robert III 1340–1346
 Jean II 1360–1385
 Estold d'Estouteville 1385–1388
 Simon du Bosc 1388–1391  
 Robert IV 1392–1393
 Jean III 1397
 Thomas du Bourg 1399–1427
 Jean IV 1429–1432
 Noël Sabine 1436–1446
 Richard Sabine 1446–1472, built the cloister in 1470
 Laurent Le Clerc 1472–1499
 Claude de Husson 1502–1509, Bishop of Poitiers
 Jacques de Silly 1509–1539 
 Georges d'Amboise 1539–1550, Bishop of Rouen
 Charles de Bourbon 1550–1557
 Antoine d'Apchon 1557–1580, Bishop of Tarbes
 Alexandre de la Guesle 1580
 Jean V 1581
 François de la Guesle 1584–1614, Archbishop of Tours
 Pierre Habert 1614–1630
 Henri-Louis Habert de Montmort 1631–1637
 Germain Habert 1637–1654, member of the Académie française
 Jules Mazarin 1654–1661, cardinal
 Philippe de Vendôme 1661–1727, Grand Prior for France
 Paul d'Albert de Luynes 1727–1788, Bishop of Bayeux, Bishop of Sens, and cardinal

See also
 French Romanesque architecture

References

Benedictine monasteries in France
Buildings and structures in Manche